This is a complete list of songs released by American heavy metal group The Mentors in alphabetical order. The list includes tracks of The Mentors studio albums Get Up and Die (1982), You Axed For It! (1985), Up the Dose (1986), Sex Drugs and Rock 'n' Roll (1989), Rock Bible (1990), To the Max (1991), Over the Top (2005) and their latest album Ducefixion (2009). It also includes the tracks of live albums Live at the Whiskey (1983) and Live in Frisco (1987) among listing the lead vocalists of the songs.

This list does not include songs released only separately by the individual members. For individual members recordings see articles Eldon Hoke, Sickie Wifebeater and Dr. Heathen Scum.

List of The Mentors songs in alphabetical order

Notes and references 
Spirit of Metal: The Mentors - complete albums discography
The Mentors: The Kings of Sleze - Discography

See also
The Mentors discography

Mentors (band)
Mentors, The